The 1940 VFL Grand Final was an Australian rules football game contested between the Melbourne Football Club and Richmond Football Club, held at the Melbourne Cricket Ground in Melbourne on 28 September 1940. It was the 42nd annual Grand Final of the Victorian Football League, staged to determine the premiers for the 1940 VFL season. The match, attended by 70,330 spectators, was won by Melbourne by a margin of 39 points, marking that club's fourth premiership victory.

This was Melbourne's second successive premiership, having defeated Collingwood in the 1939 VFL Grand Final.

Teams

 Umpire - Alan Coward

Statistics

Goalkickers

References
AFL Tables: 1940 Grand Final

See also
 1940 VFL season

VFL/AFL Grand Finals
Grand
Melbourne Football Club
Richmond Football Club
September 1940 sports events